Auetal is a municipality in the district of Schaumburg, in Lower Saxony, Germany. It is situated approximately 10 km south of Stadthagen, and 22 km east of Minden. Its seat is in the village Rehren.

The coat of arms features an image of the "Tilly-Buche", (1739-1994) a dwarf beech tree which existed in the area.

References

External links 
Auetal community
Some more information about Auetal

Schaumburg